The 1980 Soviet football championship was the 49th seasons of competitive football in the Soviet Union. Dinamo Kiev won the Top League championship becoming the Soviet domestic champions for the ninth time.

Honours

Notes = Number in parentheses is the times that club has won that honour. * indicates new record for competition

Soviet Union football championship

Top League

First League

Second League (finals)

 [Oct 26 – Nov 12]

Finals 1

Finals 2

Finals 3

Top goalscorers

Top League
 Sergei Andreyev (SKA Rostov-na-Donu) – 20 goals

First League
Volodymyr Naumenko (Tavriya Simferopol) – 33 goals

References

External links
 1980 Soviet football championship. RSSSF